Her Life and His is a 1917 American silent drama film directed by Frederick Sullivan and starring Florence La Badie, Holmes Herbert and Ethyle Cooke.

Plot

Cast
 Florence La Badie as Mary Murdock 
 Holmes Herbert as Ralph Howard 
 Ethyle Cooke as Mrs. Nan Travers 
 Harris Gordon as Undetermined Role 
 Samuel N. Niblack as Emmett Conger 
 Arthur Bauer as Undetermined Role 
 Jean La Motte as Undetermined Role
 Justus D. Barnes as Political Boss 
 Joseph Phillips as Undetermined Role

References

Bibliography
 Robert B. Connelly. The Silents: Silent Feature Films, 1910-36, Volume 40, Issue 2. December Press, 1998.

External links
 

1917 films
1917 drama films
1910s English-language films
American silent feature films
Silent American drama films
American black-and-white films
Films directed by Frederic Richard Sullivan
Pathé Exchange films
1910s American films